McKenzie Creek is a stream in Wayne County in the U.S. state of Missouri. It is a tributary of the Black River.

McKenzie Creek has the name of a pioneer citizen.

See also
List of rivers of Missouri

References

Rivers of Wayne County, Missouri
Rivers of Missouri